Ross Gregory is an American historian.

Life
He served in the U.S. Army from 1954 to 1956. He graduated from Indiana University earned his B.A., M.A. and Ph.D. His doctoral advisor was the historian Robert H. Ferrell.
He taught at West Virginia University Institute of Technology, and at Western Michigan University from 1966 to 2005.

Awards
 1969 Frederick Jackson Turner Award

Works
 Walter Hines Page: Ambassador to the Court of St. James’s, University Press of Kentucky, 1970  (reprint ACLS History E-Book Project, 2008)
 The Origins of American Intervention in the First World War, Norton, 1971

References

External links
"Review: Almanacs of American Life", The History Teacher
"Review:Pay and Price", History Teacher, Claudine L. Ferrell, 1997

Year of birth missing (living people)
Living people
21st-century American historians
American male non-fiction writers
Indiana University alumni
West Virginia University Institute of Technology faculty
Western Michigan University faculty
United States Army soldiers
21st-century American male writers